Leading Edge Brands is a soft drink marketing and manufacturing company based in Temple, Texas.

Leading Edge Brands (LEB) is part of the McLane Group, which is headed by Drayton McLane, Jr., (also CEO of Major League Baseball's Houston Astros).  LEB's CEO is Webb Stickney, and its products are distributed in the United States, the Caribbean, Mexico and the South Pacific.

Leading Edge Brands was founded in 1997 when the Kist and Flavette soda brands were purchased from the Monarch Beverage Company. The Frostie Root Beer brand was purchased from Monarch in 2000 and sold in 2009. The company had sales of $36.8 million in 2006.

In 2009, Interstate Distributors in Detroit, Michigan purchase the Frostie and Kist brands.

Brands
 Frostie Root Beer
 Frostie Diet Root Beer
 Frostie Blue Cream Soda
 Frostie Cherry Limeade
 Frostie Concorde Grape
 Frostie Orange
 Frostie Vanilla Root Beer
 KIST
 KIST Blue Cream Soda
 KIST Cola
 KIST Fruit Punch
 KIST Grape
 KIST Lemon Lime
 KIST Mountain
 KIST Peach
 KIST Orange
 KIST Pineapple
 KIST Strawberry
 Heaven's Rain Bottled Water

References

External links 
 Leading Edge Brands webpage

American soft drinks
Drink companies of the United States
Food and drink companies based in Texas